Chile, officially the Republic of Chile, is a country located in western South America. It is the southernmost country in the world and closest to Antarctica, stretching along a narrow strip of land between the Andes Mountains and the Pacific Ocean. The capital and largest city of Chile is Santiago, and the national language is Spanish.

Spain conquered and colonized the region in the mid-16th century, replacing Inca rule, but failed to conquer the independent Mapuche people who inhabited what is now south-central Chile. In 1818, after declaring independence from Spain, Chile emerged as a relatively stable authoritarian republic in the 1830s. During the 19th century, Chile experienced significant economic and territorial growth, putting an end to Mapuche resistance in the 1880s and gaining its current northern territory in the War of the Pacific (1879–83) by defeating Peru and Bolivia. In the 20th century, up until the 1970s, Chile underwent a process of democratization and experienced rapid population growth and urbanization, while relying increasingly on exports from copper mining to support its economy. During the 1960s and 1970s, the country was marked by severe left-right political polarization and turmoil, which culminated in the 1973 Chilean coup d'état that overthrew Salvador Allende's democratically elected left-wing government. This was followed by a 16-year right-wing military dictatorship under Augusto Pinochet, which resulted in more than 3,000 deaths or disappearances. The regime ended in 1990, following a referendum in 1988, and was succeeded by a center-left coalition, which ruled until 2010.

Chile is a developing country with a high-income economy and ranks 42nd in the Human Development Index. It is one of the most economically and socially stable nations in South America, and leads Latin America in competitiveness, per capita income, globalization, peace, and economic freedom. Chile also performs well in the region in terms of sustainability of the state and democratic development, and boasts the second lowest homicide rate in the Americas, following only Canada. Chile is a founding member of the United Nations, the Community of Latin American and Caribbean States (CELAC), and the Pacific Alliance, and joined the OECD in 2010.

Etymology
There are various theories about the origin of the word Chile. According to 17th-century Spanish chronicler Diego de Rosales, the Incas called the valley of the Aconcagua Chili by corruption of the name of a Picunche tribal chief called Tili, who ruled the area at the time of the Incan conquest in the 15th century. Another theory points to the similarity of the valley of the Aconcagua with that of the Casma Valley in Peru, where there was a town and valley named Chili.

Another origin attributed to chilli is the onomatopoeic —the Mapuche imitation of the warble of a bird locally known as trile.

The Spanish conquistadors heard about this name from the Incas, and the few survivors of Diego de Almagro's first Spanish expedition south from Peru in 1535–36 called themselves the "men of Chilli". Ultimately, Almagro is credited with the universalization of the name Chile, after naming the Mapocho valley as such. The older spelling "Chili" was in use in English until the early 20th century before switching to "Chile."

History

Early history

Stone tool evidence indicates humans sporadically frequented the Monte Verde valley area as long as 18,500 years ago. About 10,000 years ago, migrating Indigenous Peoples settled in fertile valleys and coastal areas of what is present-day Chile. Settlement sites from very early human habitation include Monte Verde, Cueva del Milodón and the Pali-Aike Crater's lava tube.

The Incas briefly extended their empire into what is now northern Chile, but the Mapuche (or Araucanians as they were known by the Spaniards) successfully resisted many attempts by the Inca Empire to subjugate them, despite their lack of state organization. They fought against the Sapa Inca Tupac Yupanqui and his army. The result of the bloody three-day confrontation known as the Battle of the Maule was that the Inca conquest of the territories of Chile ended at the Maule river.

Spanish colonization

In 1520, while attempting to circumnavigate the globe, Ferdinand Magellan discovered the southern passage now named after him (the Strait of Magellan) thus becoming the first European to set foot on what is now Chile. The next Europeans to reach Chile were Diego de Almagro and his band of Spanish conquistadors, who came from Peru in 1535 seeking gold. The Spanish encountered various cultures that supported themselves principally through slash-and-burn agriculture and hunting.

The conquest of Chile began in earnest in 1540 and was carried out by Pedro de Valdivia, one of Francisco Pizarro's lieutenants, who founded the city of Santiago on 12 February 1541. Although the Spanish did not find the extensive gold and silver they sought, they recognized the agricultural potential of Chile's central valley, and Chile became part of the Spanish Empire.

Conquest took place gradually, and the Europeans suffered repeated setbacks. A massive Mapuche insurrection that began in 1553 resulted in Valdivia's death and the destruction of many of the colony's principal settlements. Subsequent major insurrections took place in 1598 and in 1655. Each time the Mapuche and other native groups revolted, the southern border of the colony was driven northward. The abolition of slavery by the Spanish crown in 1683 was done in recognition that enslaving the Mapuche intensified resistance rather than cowing them into submission. Despite royal prohibitions, relations remained strained from continual colonialist interference.

Cut off to the north by desert, to the south by the Mapuche, to the east by the Andes Mountains, and to the west by the ocean, Chile became one of the most centralized, homogeneous colonies in Spanish America. Serving as a sort of frontier garrison, the colony found itself with the mission of forestalling encroachment by both the Mapuche and Spain's European enemies, especially the English and the Dutch. Buccaneers and pirates menaced the colony in addition to the Mapuche, as was shown by Sir Francis Drake's 1578 raid on Valparaíso, the colony's principal port. Chile hosted one of the largest standing armies in the Americas, making it one of the most militarized of the Spanish possessions, as well as a drain on the treasury of the Viceroyalty of Peru.

The first general census was conducted by the government of Agustín de Jáuregui between 1777 and 1778; it indicated that the population consisted of 259,646 inhabitants: 73.5% of European descent, 7.9% mestizos, 8.6% indigenous peoples and 9.8% blacks. Francisco Hurtado, Governor of the province of Chiloé, conducted a census in 1784 and found the population consisted of 26,703 inhabitants, 64.4% of whom were whites and 33.5% of whom were natives. The Diocese of Concepción conducted a census in areas south of the Maule river in 1812, but did not include the indigenous population or the inhabitants of the province of Chiloé. The population is estimated at 210,567, 86.1% of whom were Spanish or of European descent, 10% of whom were indigenous and 3.7% of whom were mestizos, blacks and mulattos.

A 2021 study by Baten and Llorca-Jaña shows that regions with a relatively high share of North European migrants developed faster in terms of numeracy, even if the overall number of migrants was small. This effect might be related to externalities: the surrounding population adopted a similar behavior as the small non-European immigrant group, and new schools were created. Ironically, there might have been positive spillover effects from the educational investment made by migrants, at the same time numeracy might have been reduced by the greater inequality in these regions. However, the positive effects of immigration were apparently stronger.

Independence and nation building

In 1808, Napoleon's enthronement of his brother Joseph as the Spanish King precipitated the drive by the colony for independence from Spain. A national junta in the name of Ferdinand – heir to the deposed king – was formed on 18 September 1810. The Government Junta of Chile proclaimed Chile an autonomous republic within the Spanish monarchy (in memory of this day, Chile celebrates its National Day on 18 September each year).

After these events, a movement for total independence, under the command of José Miguel Carrera (one of the most renowned patriots) and his two brothers Juan José and Luis Carrera, soon gained a wider following. Spanish attempts to re-impose arbitrary rule during what was called the Reconquista led to a prolonged struggle, including infighting from Bernardo O'Higgins, who challenged Carrera's leadership.

Intermittent warfare continued until 1817. With Carrera in prison in Argentina, O'Higgins and anti-Carrera cohort José de San Martín, hero of the Argentine War of Independence, led an army that crossed the Andes into Chile and defeated the royalists. On 12 February 1818, Chile was proclaimed an independent republic. The political revolt brought little social change, however, and 19th-century Chilean society preserved the essence of the stratified colonial social structure, which was greatly influenced by family politics and the Roman Catholic Church. A strong presidency eventually emerged, but wealthy landowners remained powerful. Bernardo O'Higgins once planned to expand Chile by liberating the Philippines from Spain and incorporating the islands. In this regard he tasked the Scottish naval officer, Lord Thomas Cochrane, in a letter dated November 12, 1821, expressing his plan to conquer Guayaquil, the Galapagos Islands, and the Philippines. There were preparations, but the plan didn't push through because O' Higgins was exiled.

Chile slowly started to expand its influence and to establish its borders. By the Tantauco Treaty, the archipelago of Chiloé was incorporated in 1826. The economy began to boom due to the discovery of silver ore in Chañarcillo, and the growing trade of the port of Valparaíso, which led to conflict over maritime supremacy in the Pacific with Peru. At the same time, attempts were made to strengthen sovereignty in southern Chile intensifying penetration into Araucanía and colonizing Llanquihue with German immigrants in 1848. Through the founding of Fort Bulnes by the Schooner Ancud under the command of John Williams Wilson, the Magallanes region joined the country in 1843, while the Antofagasta region, at the time part of Bolivia, began to fill with people.

Toward the end of the 19th century, the government in Santiago consolidated its position in the south by the Occupation of Araucanía. The Boundary treaty of 1881 between Chile and Argentina confirmed Chilean sovereignty over the Strait of Magellan. As a result of the War of the Pacific with Peru and Bolivia (1879–83), Chile expanded its territory northward by almost one-third, eliminating Bolivia's access to the Pacific, and acquired valuable nitrate deposits, the exploitation of which led to an era of national affluence. Chile had joined the stand as one of the high-income countries in South America by 1870.

The 1891 Chilean Civil War brought about a redistribution of power between the President and Congress, and Chile established a parliamentary style democracy. However, the Civil War had also been a contest between those who favored the development of local industries and powerful Chilean banking interests, particularly the House of Edwards which had strong ties to foreign investors. Soon after, the country engaged in a vastly expensive naval arms race with Argentina that nearly led to war.

20th century

The Chilean economy partially degenerated into a system protecting the interests of a ruling oligarchy. By the 1920s, the emerging middle and working classes were powerful enough to elect a reformist president, Arturo Alessandri, whose program was frustrated by a conservative congress. In the 1920s, Marxist groups with strong popular support arose.

A military coup led by General Luis Altamirano in 1924 set off a period of political instability that lasted until 1932. Of the ten governments that held power in that period, the longest lasting was that of General Carlos Ibáñez del Campo, who briefly held power in 1925 and then again between 1927 and 1931 in what was a de facto dictatorship (although not really comparable in harshness or corruption to the type of military dictatorship that have often bedeviled the rest of Latin America).

By relinquishing power to a democratically elected successor, Ibáñez del Campo retained the respect of a large enough segment of the population to remain a viable politician for more than thirty years, in spite of the vague and shifting nature of his ideology. When constitutional rule was restored in 1932, a strong middle-class party, the Radicals, emerged. It became the key force in coalition governments for the next 20 years. During the period of Radical Party dominance (1932–52), the state increased its role in the economy. In 1952, voters returned Ibáñez del Campo to office for another six years. Jorge Alessandri succeeded Ibáñez del Campo in 1958, bringing Chilean conservatism back into power democratically for another term.

The 1964 presidential election of Christian Democrat Eduardo Frei Montalva by an absolute majority initiated a period of major reform. Under the slogan "Revolution in Liberty", the Frei administration embarked on far-reaching social and economic programs, particularly in education, housing, and agrarian reform, including rural unionization of agricultural workers. By 1967, however, Frei encountered increasing opposition from leftists, who charged that his reforms were inadequate, and from conservatives, who found them excessive. At the end of his term, Frei had not fully achieved his party's ambitious goals.

In the 1970 election, Senator Salvador Allende of the Socialist Party of Chile (then part of the "Popular Unity" coalition which included the Communists, Radicals, Social-Democrats, dissident Christian Democrats, the Popular Unitary Action Movement, and the Independent Popular Action), achieved a partial majority in a plurality of votes in a three-way contest, followed by candidates Radomiro Tomic for the Christian Democrat Party and Jorge Alessandri for the Conservative Party. Allende was not elected with an absolute majority, receiving fewer than 35% of the votes.

The Chilean Congress conducted a runoff vote between the leading candidates, Allende and former president Jorge Alessandri, and, keeping with tradition, chose Allende by a vote of 153 to 35. Frei refused to form an alliance with Alessandri to oppose Allende, on the grounds that the Christian Democrats were a workers' party and could not make common cause with the right wing.

An economic depression that began in 1972 was exacerbated by capital flight, plummeting private investment, and withdrawal of bank deposits in response to Allende's socialist program. Production fell and unemployment rose. Allende adopted measures including price freezes, wage increases, and tax reforms, to increase consumer spending and redistribute income downward. Joint public-private public works projects helped reduce unemployment. Much of the banking sector was nationalized. Many enterprises within the copper, coal, iron, nitrate, and steel industries were expropriated, nationalized, or subjected to state intervention. Industrial output increased sharply and unemployment fell during the Allende administration's first year.

Allende's program included advancement of workers' interests, replacing the judicial system with "socialist legality", nationalization of banks and forcing others to bankruptcy, and strengthening "popular militias" known as MIR. Started under former President Frei, the Popular Unity platform also called for nationalization of Chile's major copper mines in the form of a constitutional amendment. The measure was passed unanimously by Congress. As a result, the Richard Nixon administration organized and inserted secret operatives in Chile, in order to swiftly destabilize Allende's government. In addition, US financial pressure restricted international economic credit to Chile.

The economic problems were also exacerbated by Allende's public spending which was financed mostly by printing money and poor credit ratings given by commercial banks.
Simultaneously, opposition media, politicians, business guilds and other organizations helped to accelerate a campaign of domestic political and economical destabilization, some of which was backed by the United States. By early 1973, inflation was out of control. 
On 26 May 1973, Chile's Supreme Court, which was opposed to Allende's government, unanimously denounced Allende's disruption of the legality of the nation. Although illegal under the Chilean constitution, the court supported and strengthened Pinochet's soon-to-be seizure of power.

Pinochet era (1973–1990)

A military coup overthrew Allende on 11 September 1973. As the armed forces bombarded the presidential palace, Allende apparently committed suicide. After the coup, Henry Kissinger told U.S. president Richard Nixon that the United States had "helped" the coup.

A military junta, led by General Augusto Pinochet, took control of the country. The first years of the regime were marked by human rights violations. Chile actively participated in Operation Condor. In October 1973, at least 72 people were murdered by the Caravan of Death. According to the Rettig Report and Valech Commission, at least 2,115 were killed, and at least 27,265 were tortured (including 88 children younger than 12 years old). In 2011, Chile recognized an additional 9,800 victims, bringing the total number of killed, tortured or imprisoned for political reasons to 40,018. At the national stadium, filled with detainees, one of those tortured and killed was internationally known poet-singer Víctor Jara (see "Music and Dance", below). 

A new Constitution was approved by a controversial plebiscite on 11 September 1980, and General Pinochet became president of the republic for an eight-year term. After Pinochet obtained rule of the country, several hundred committed Chilean revolutionaries joined the Sandinista army in Nicaragua, guerrilla forces in Argentina or training camps in Cuba, Eastern Europe and Northern Africa.

In the late 1980s, largely as a result of events such as the 1982 economic collapse and mass civil resistance in 1983–88, the government gradually permitted greater freedom of assembly, speech, and association, to include trade union and political activity. The government launched market-oriented reforms with Hernán Büchi as Minister of Finance. Chile moved toward a free market economy that saw an increase in domestic and foreign private investment, although the copper industry and other important mineral resources were not opened to competition. In a plebiscite on 5 October 1988, Pinochet was denied a second eight-year term as president (56% against 44%). Chileans elected a new president and the majority of members of a bicameral congress on 14 December 1989. Christian Democrat Patricio Aylwin, the candidate of a coalition of 17 political parties called the Concertación, received an absolute majority of votes (55%). President Aylwin served from 1990 to 1994, in what was considered a transition period.

21st century

In December 1993, Christian Democrat Eduardo Frei Ruiz-Tagle, the son of previous president Eduardo Frei Montalva, led the Concertación coalition to victory with an absolute majority of votes (58%). Frei Ruiz-Tagle was succeeded in 2000 by Socialist Ricardo Lagos, who won the presidency in an unprecedented runoff election against Joaquín Lavín of the rightist Alliance for Chile. In January 2006, Chileans elected their first female president, Michelle Bachelet Jeria, of the Socialist Party, defeating Sebastián Piñera, of the National Renewal party, extending the Concertación governance for another four years. In January 2010, Chileans elected Sebastián Piñera as the first rightist President in 20 years, defeating former President Eduardo Frei Ruiz-Tagle of the Concertación, for a four-year term succeeding Bachelet. Due to term limits, Sebastián Piñera did not stand for re-election in 2013, and his term expired in March 2014 resulting in Michelle Bachelet returning to office. Sebastián Piñera succeeded Bachelet again in 2018 as the President of Chile after winning the December 2017 presidential election.

On 27 February 2010, Chile was struck by an 8.8  earthquake, the fifth largest ever recorded at the time. More than 500 people died (most from the ensuing tsunami) and over a million people lost their homes. The earthquake was also followed by multiple aftershocks. Initial damage estimates were in the range of US$15–30 billion, around 10% to 15% of Chile's real gross domestic product.

Chile achieved global recognition for the successful rescue of 33 trapped miners in 2010. A rescue effort organized by the Chilean government located the miners 17 days later. All 33 men were brought to the surface two months later on 13 October 2010 over a period of almost 24 hours, an effort that was carried on live television around the world.

2019–20 Chilean protests are a series of country-wide protests in response to a rise in the Santiago Metro's subway fare, the increased cost of living, privatization and inequality prevalent in the country. On 15 November, most of the political parties represented in the National Congress signed an agreement to call a national referendum in April 2020 regarding the creation of a new Constitution, later postponed to October due to the COVID-19 pandemic. On 25 October 2020, Chileans voted 78.28 per cent in favor of a new constitution, while 21.72 per cent rejected the change. Voter turnout was 51 percent. An election for the members of the Constitutional Convention was held in Chile between 15 and 16 May 2021.

On 19 December 2021, a leftist candidate, the 35-year-old former student protest leader Gabriel Boric, won Chile's presidential election to become the country's youngest ever leader. On 11 March 2022, Boric was sworn in as president to succeed outgoing President Sebastian Pinera. Out of 24 members of Gabriel Boric's female-majority Cabinet, 14 are women.

On 4 September 2022, voters rejected overwhelmingly the new constitution in the constitutional referendum, which was put forward by the constitutional convention. The rejected new constitution, supported strongly by president Boric, proved to be too radical and left-leaning for the majority of voters.

Geography 

This encompasses a remarkable variety of climates and landscapes. It contains  of land area. It is situated within the Pacific Ring of Fire. Excluding its Pacific islands and Antarctic claim, Chile lies between latitudes 17° and 56°S, and longitudes 66° and 75°W.

Chile is among the longest north–south countries in the world. If one considers only mainland territory, Chile is unique within this group in its narrowness from east to west, with the other long north–south countries (including Brazil, Russia, Canada, and the United States, among others) all being wider from east to west by a factor of more than 10. Chile also claims  of Antarctica as part of its territory (Chilean Antarctic Territory). However, this latter claim is suspended under the terms of the Antarctic Treaty, of which Chile is a signatory. It is the world's southernmost country that is geographically on the mainland.

Also controlled but only temporarily inhabited (by some local fishermen) are the small islands of San Ambrosio and San Felix. These islands are notable because they extend Chile's claim to territorial waters out from its coast into the Pacific Ocean.

The northern Atacama Desert contains great mineral wealth, primarily copper and nitrates. The relatively small Central Valley, which includes Santiago, dominates the country in terms of population and agricultural resources. This area is also the historical center from which Chile expanded in the late 19th century when it integrated the northern and southern regions. Southern Chile is rich in forests, grazing lands, and features a string of volcanoes and lakes. The southern coast is a labyrinth of fjords, inlets, canals, twisting peninsulas, and islands. The Andes Mountains are located on the eastern border.

Topography 

Chile is located along a highly seismic and volcanic zone, part of the Pacific Ring of Fire, due to the subduction of the Nazca and Antarctic plates in the South American plate. Late Paleozoic, 251 million years ago, Chile belonged to the continental block called Gondwana. It was just a depression that accumulated marine sediments began to rise at the end of the Mesozoic, 66 million years ago, due to the collision between the Nazca and South American plates, resulting in the Andes. The territory would be shaped over millions of years by the folding of the rocks, forming the current relief.

The Chilean relief consists of the central depression, which crosses the country longitudinally, flanked by two mountain ranges that make up about 80% of the territory: the Andes mountains to the east-natural border with Bolivia and Argentina in the region of Atacama and the Coastal Range west-minor height from the Andes. Chile's highest peak is the Nevado Ojos del Salado, at 6891.3 m, which is also the highest volcano in the world. The highest point of the Coastal Range is Vicuña Mackenna, at 3114 meters, located in the Sierra Vicuña Mackenna, the south of Antofagasta. Among the coastal mountains and the Pacific is a series of coastal plains, of variable length, which allow the settlement of coastal towns and big ports. Some areas of the plains territories encompass territory east of the Andes, and the Patagonian steppes and Magellan, or are high plateaus surrounded by high mountain ranges, such as the Altiplano or Puna de Atacama.

The Far North is the area between the northern boundary of the country and the parallel 26° S, covering the first three regions. It is characterized by the presence of the Atacama desert, the aridest in the world. The desert is fragmented by streams that originate in the area known as the pampas Tamarugal. The Andes, split in two and whose eastern arm runs through Bolivia, has a high altitude and volcanic activity, which has allowed the formation of the Andean altiplano and salt structures as the Salar de Atacama, due to the gradual accumulation of sediments over time.

To the south is the Norte Chico, extending to the Aconcagua river. Los Andes begin to decrease its altitude to the south and closer to the coast, reaching 90 km away at the height of Illapel, the narrowest part of the Chilean territory. The two mountain ranges intersect, virtually eliminating the intermediate depression. The existence of rivers flowing through the territory allows the formation of transverse valleys, where agriculture has developed strongly in recent times, while the coastal plains begin to expand.

The Central area is the most populated region of the country. The coastal plains are wide and allow the establishment of cities and ports along the Pacific. The Andes maintain altitudes above 6000m but descend slowly in height to 4000 meters on average. The intermediate depression reappears becoming a fertile valley that allows agricultural development and human settlement, due to sediment accumulation. To the south, the Cordillera de la Costa reappears in the range of Nahuelbuta while glacial sediments create a series of lakes in the area of La Frontera.

Patagonia extends from within Reloncavi, at the height of parallel 41°S, to the south. During the last glaciation, this area was covered by ice that strongly eroded Chilean relief structures. As a result, the intermediate depression sinks in the sea, while the coastal mountains rise to a series of archipelagos, such as Chiloé and the Chonos, disappearing in Taitao peninsula, in the parallel 47°S. The Andes mountain range loses height and erosion caused by the action of glaciers has caused fjords. East of the Andes, on the continent, or north of it, on the island of Tierra del Fuego are located relatively flat plains, which in the Strait of Magellan cover large areas. The Andes, as he had done previously Cordillera de la Costa, begins to break in the ocean causing a myriad of islands and islets and disappear into it, sinking and reappearing in the Southern Antilles arc and then the Antarctic Peninsula, where it is called Antartandes, in the Chilean Antarctic Territory, lying between the meridians 53°W and 90°W.

In the middle of the Pacific, the country has sovereignty over several islands of volcanic origin, collectively known as Insular Chile. The archipelago of Juan Fernandez and Easter Island is located in the fracture zone between the Nazca plate and the Pacific plate known as East Pacific Rise.

Climate and hydrography 

The diverse climate of Chile ranges from the world's driest desert in the north—the Atacama Desert—through a Mediterranean climate in the center, humid subtropical in Easter Island, to an oceanic climate, including alpine tundra and glaciers in the east and south. According to the Köppen system, Chile within its borders hosts at least ten major climatic subtypes. There are four seasons in most of the country: summer (December to February), autumn (March to May), winter (June to August), and spring (September to November).

Due to the characteristics of the territory, Chile is crossed by numerous rivers generally short in length and with low flow rates. They commonly extend from the Andes to the Pacific Ocean, flowing from East to West. Because of the Atacama desert, in the Norte Grande there are only short endorheic character streams, except for the Loa River, the longest in the country 440 km. In the high valleys, wetland areas generate Chungará Lake, located at 4500 meters above sea level. It and the Lauca River are shared with Bolivia, as well as the Lluta River. In the center-north of the country, the number of rivers that form valleys of agricultural importance increases. Noteworthy are the Elqui with 75 km long, 142 km Aconcagua, Maipo with 250 km and its tributary, the Mapocho with 110 km, and Maule with 240 km. Their waters mainly flow from Andean snowmelt in the summer and winter rains. The major lakes in this area are the artificial lake Rapel, the Colbun Maule lagoon and the lagoon of La Laja.

Biodiversity

The flora and fauna of Chile are characterized by a high degree of endemism, due to its particular geography. In continental Chile, the Atacama Desert in the north and the Andes mountains to the east are barriers that have led to the isolation of flora and fauna. Add to that the enormous length of Chile (over ) and this results in a wide range of climates and environments that can be divided into three general zones: the desert provinces of the north, central Chile, and the humid regions of the south.

The native flora of Chile consists of relatively fewer species compared to the flora of other South American countries. 
The northernmost coastal and central region is largely barren of vegetation, approaching the most absolute desert in the world.
On the slopes of the Andes, in addition to the scattered tola desert brush, grasses are found. The central valley is characterized by several species of cacti, the hardy espinos, the Chilean pine, the southern beeches and the copihue, a red bell-shaped flower that is Chile's national flower.

In southern Chile, south of the Biobío River, heavy precipitation has produced dense forests of laurels, magnolias, and various species of conifers and beeches, which become smaller and more stunted to the south.
The cold temperatures and winds of the extreme south preclude heavy forestation. Grassland is found in Atlantic Chile (in Patagonia). Much of the Chilean flora is distinct from that of neighboring Argentina, indicating that the Andean barrier existed during its formation.

Some of Chile's flora has an Antarctic origin due to land bridges which formed during the Cretaceous ice ages, allowing plants to migrate from Antarctica to South America. Chile had a 2018 Forest Landscape Integrity Index mean score of 7.37/10, ranking it 43rd globally out of 172 countries.

Just over 3,000 species of fungi are recorded in Chile, but this number is far from complete. The true total number of fungal species occurring in Chile is likely to be far higher, given the generally accepted estimate that only about 7 percent of all fungi worldwide have so far been discovered. Although the amount of available information is still very small, a first effort has been made to estimate the number of fungal species endemic to Chile, and 1995 species have been tentatively identified as possible endemics of the country.

Chile's geographical isolation has restricted the immigration of faunal life so that only a few of the many distinctive South American animals are found. Among the larger mammals are the puma or cougar, the llama-like guanaco and the fox-like chilla. In the forest region, several types of marsupials and a small deer known as the pudu are found.

There are many species of small birds, but most of the larger common Latin American types are absent. Few freshwater fish are native, but North American trout have been successfully introduced into the Andean lakes. Owing to the vicinity of the Humboldt Current, ocean waters abound with fish and other forms of marine life, which in turn support a rich variety of waterfowl, including several penguins. Whales are abundant, and some six species of seals are found in the area.

Government and politics 

The current Constitution of Chile was drafted by Jaime Guzmán in 1980 and subsequently approved via a national plebiscite—regarded as "highly irregular" by some observers—in September of that year, under the military dictatorship of Augusto Pinochet. It entered into force in March 1981. After Pinochet's defeat in the 1988 plebiscite, the constitution was amended to ease provisions for future amendments to the Constitution. In September 2005, President Ricardo Lagos signed into law several constitutional amendments passed by Congress. These include eliminating the positions of appointed senators and senators for life, granting the President authority to remove the commanders-in-chief of the armed forces, and reducing the presidential term from six to four years.

Chile's judiciary is independent and includes a court of appeal, a system of military courts, a constitutional tribunal, and the Supreme Court of Chile. In June 2005, Chile completed a nationwide overhaul of its criminal justice system. The reform has replaced inquisitorial proceedings with an adversarial system with greater similarity to that of common law jurisdictions such as the United States.

For parliamentary elections, between 1989 and 2013 the binominal system was used, which promoted the establishment of two majority political blocs -Concertación and Alliance- at the expense of the exclusion of non-majority political groups. The opponents of this system approved in 2015 a moderate proportional electoral system that has been in force since the 2017 parliamentary elections, allowing the entry of new parties and coalitions. The Congress of Chile has a 50-seat Senate and a 155-member Chamber of Deputies. Senators serve for eight years with staggered terms, while deputies are elected every 4 years. The last congressional elections were held on 21 November 2021, concurrently with the presidential election.

The main existing political coalitions in Chile are:

Government:

 Apruebo Dignidad (Approve Dignity) is a left-wing coalition that has its origin in the 2021 Chilean Constitutional Convention election. After the success in that election, it held presidential primaries, in which Gabriel Boric (CS, FA) was the winner. It is formed by the coalition Frente Amplio (Broad Font) and the coalition Chile Digno (Worthy Chile) formed by the Communist Party of Chile  and others left-wing parties.
 Democratic Socialism is a center-left coalition, successor of the Constituent Unity, and this of the Concertation -which supported the "NO" option in the 1988 plebiscite and subsequently governed the country from 1990 to 2010-. This pact is formed by the parties Socialist, for Democracy, Radical, and Liberal.

Opposition:

 Chile Vamos (Let’s go Chile) is a center-right coalition with roots of liberal conservatism, formed by the parties Renovación Nacional (National Renewal), Unión Demócrata Independiente (Independent Democratic Union) and Evópoli. It has its origins in the Alliance coalition, formed by the main parties that supported the "YES" option in the 1988 plebiscite, although it has used different names since then. It was the ruling coalition during the first and second government of Sebastián Piñera, (2010–2014) and (2018–2022).

In the National Congress, Chile Vamos has 52 deputies and 24 senators, while the parliamentary group of Apruebo Dignidad is formed by 37 deputies and 6 senators. Democratic Socialism is the third political force with 30 deputies and 13 senators. The other groups with parliamentary representation are the Republican Party (15 deputies and 1 senator), the Christian Democratic Party (8 deputies and 5 senators), the Party of the People (8 deputies) and the independents outside of a coalition (5 deputies and 1 senator).

Foreign relations 

Since the early decades after independence, Chile has always had an active involvement in foreign affairs. In 1837, the country aggressively challenged the dominance of Peru's port of Callao for preeminence in the Pacific trade routes, defeating the short-lived alliance between Peru and Bolivia, the Peru-Bolivian Confederation (1836–39) in the War of the Confederation. The war dissolved the confederation while distributing power in the Pacific. A second international war, the War of the Pacific (1879–83), further increased Chile's regional role, while adding considerably to its territory.

During the 19th century, Chile's commercial ties were primarily with Britain, a nation that had a major influence on the formation of the Chilean navy. The French, influenced Chile's legal and educational systems and had a decisive impact on Chile, through the architecture of the capital in the boom years at the turn of the 20th century. German influence came from the organization and training of the army by Prussians.

On 26 June 1945, Chile participated as a founding member of the United Nations being among 50 countries that signed the United Nations Charter in San Francisco, California. With the military coup of 1973, Chile became isolated politically as a result of widespread human rights abuses.

Since its return to democracy in 1990, Chile has been an active participant in the international political arena. Chile completed a two-year non-permanent position on the UN Security Council in January 2005. Jose Miguel Insulza, a Chilean national, was elected Secretary General of the Organization of American States in May 2005 and confirmed in his position, being re-elected in 2009. Chile is currently serving on the International Atomic Energy Agency (IAEA) Board of Governors, and the 2007–2008 chair of the board is Chile's ambassador to the IAEA, Milenko E. Skoknic. The country is an active member of the UN family of agencies and participates in UN peacekeeping activities. It was re-elected as a member of the UN Human Rights Council in 2011 for a three-year term. It was also elected to one of five non-permanent seats on the UN Security Council in 2013. Chile hosted the Defense Ministerial of the Americas in 2002 and the APEC summit and related meetings in 2004. It also hosted the Community of Democracies ministerial in April 2005 and the Ibero-American Summit in November 2007. An associate member of Mercosur and a full member of APEC, Chile has been a major player in international economic issues and hemispheric free trade.

Military

The Armed Forces of Chile are subject to civilian control exercised by the president through the Minister of Defense. The president has the authority to remove the commanders-in-chief of the armed forces.

The commander-in-chief of the Chilean Army is Army General Ricardo Martínez Menanteau. The Chilean Army is 45,000 strong and is organized with an Army headquarters in Santiago, six divisions throughout its territory, an Air Brigade in Rancagua, and a Special Forces Command in Colina. The Chilean Army is one of the most professional and technologically advanced armies in Latin America.

Admiral Julio Leiva Molina directs the around 25,000-person Chilean Navy, including 2,500 Marines. Of the fleet of 29 surface vessels, only eight are operational major combatants (frigates). Those ships are based in Valparaíso. The Navy operates its own aircraft for transport and patrol; there are no Navy fighter or bomber aircraft. The Navy also operates four submarines based in Talcahuano.

Air Force General (four-star) Jorge Rojas Ávila heads the 12,500-strong Chilean Air Force. Air assets are distributed among five air brigades headquartered in Iquique, Antofagasta, Santiago, Puerto Montt, and Punta Arenas. The Air Force also operates an airbase on King George Island, Antarctica. The Air Force took delivery of the final two of ten F-16s, all purchased from the U.S., in March 2007 after several decades of U.S. debate and previous refusal to sell. Chile also took delivery in 2007 of a number of reconditioned Block 15 F-16s from the Netherlands, bringing to 18 the total of F-16s purchased from the Dutch.

After the military coup in September 1973, the Chilean national police (Carabineros) were incorporated into the Defense Ministry. With the return of democratic government, the police were placed under the operational control of the Interior Ministry but remained under the nominal control of the Defense Ministry. Gen. Gustavo González Jure is the head of the national police force of 40,964 men and women who are responsible for law enforcement, traffic management, narcotics suppression, border control, and counter-terrorism throughout Chile.

In 2017, Chile signed the UN treaty on the Prohibition of Nuclear Weapons.

Administrative divisions

In 1978 Chile was administratively divided into regions, and in 1979 subdivided into provinces and these into communes. In total the country has 16 regions, 56 provinces and 348 communes.

Each region was designated by a name and a Roman numeral assigned from north to south, except for the Santiago Metropolitan Region, which did not have a number. The creation of two new regions in 2007, Arica and Parinacota (XV) and Los Ríos (XIV), and a third region in 2018, Ñuble (XVI) made this numbering lose its original order meaning.

National symbols

The national flower is the copihue (Lapageria rosea, Chilean bellflower), which grows in the woods of southern Chile.

The coat of arms depicts the two national animals: the condor (Vultur gryphus, a very large bird that lives in the mountains) and the huemul (Hippocamelus bisulcus, an endangered white tail deer). It also has the legend Por la razón o la fuerza (By reason or by force).

The flag of Chile consists of two equal horizontal bands of white (top) and red; there is a blue square the same height as the white band at the hoist-side end of the white band; the square bears a white five-pointed star in the center representing a guide to progress and honor; blue symbolizes the sky, white is for the snow-covered Andes, and red stands for the blood spilled to achieve independence. The flag of Chile is similar to the Flag of Texas, although the Chilean flag is 21 years older. However, like the Texan flag, the flag of Chile is modeled after the Flag of the United States.

Economy

The Central Bank of Chile in Santiago serves as the central bank for the country. The Chilean currency is the Chilean peso (CLP). Chile is one of South America's most stable and prosperous nations, leading Latin American nations in human development, competitiveness, globalization, economic freedom, and low perception of corruption. Since July 2013, Chile is considered by the World Bank as a "high-income economy".

Chile has the highest degree of economic freedom in South America (ranking 7th worldwide), owing to its independent and efficient judicial system and prudent public finance management. In May 2010 Chile became the first South American country to join the OECD. In 2006, Chile became the country with the highest nominal GDP per capita in Latin America. As of 2020, Chile ranks third in Latin America (behind Uruguay and Panama) in nominal GDP per capita.

Copper mining makes up 20% of Chilean GDP and 60% of exports. Escondida is the largest copper mine in the world, producing over 5% of global supplies. Overall, Chile produces a third of the world's copper. Codelco, the state mining firm, competes with private copper mining companies.

Sound economic policies, maintained consistently since the 1980s, have contributed to steady economic growth in Chile and have more than halved poverty rates. Chile began to experience a moderate economic downturn in 1999. The economy remained sluggish until 2003, when it began to show clear signs of recovery, achieving 4.0% GDP growth. The Chilean economy finished 2004 with growth of 6%. Real GDP growth reached 5.7% in 2005 before falling back to 4% in 2006. GDP expanded by 5% in 2007. Faced with the financial crisis of 2007–2008 the government announced an economic stimulus plan to spur employment and growth, and despite the Great Recession, aimed for an expansion of between 2% and 3% of GDP for 2009. Nonetheless, economic analysts disagreed with government estimates and predicted economic growth at a median of 1.5%. Real GDP growth in 2012 was 5.5%. Growth slowed to 4.1% in the first quarter of 2013.

The unemployment rate was 6.4% in April 2013. There are reported labor shortages in agriculture, mining, and construction. The percentage of Chileans with per capita household incomes below the poverty line—defined as twice the cost of satisfying a person's minimal nutritional needs—fell from 45.1% in 1987 to 11.5% in 2009, according to government surveys. Critics in Chile, however, argue that true poverty figures are considerably higher than those officially published. Using the relative yardstick favoured in many European countries, 27% of Chileans would be poor, according to Juan Carlos Feres of the ECLAC.

, about 11.1 million people (64% of the population) benefit from government welfare programs, via the "Social Protection Card", which includes the population living in poverty and those at a risk of falling into poverty. The privatized national pension system (AFP) has encouraged domestic investment and contributed to an estimated total domestic savings rate of approximately 21% of GDP. Under the compulsory private pension system, most formal sector employees pay 10% of their salaries into privately managed funds.

Chile has signed free trade agreements (FTAs) with a whole network of countries, including an FTA with the United States that was signed in 2003 and implemented in January 2004. Internal Government of Chile figures show that even when factoring out inflation and the recent high price of copper, bilateral trade between the U.S. and Chile has grown over 60% since then. Chile's total trade with China reached US$8.8 billion in 2006, representing nearly 66% of the value of its trade relationship with Asia. Exports to Asia increased from US$15.2 billion in 2005 to US$19.7 billion in 2006, a 29.9% increase. Year-on-year growth of imports was especially strong from a number of countries: Ecuador (123.9%), Thailand (72.1%), South Korea (52.6%), and China (36.9%).

Chile's approach to foreign direct investment is codified in the country's Foreign Investment Law. Registration is reported to be simple and transparent, and foreign investors are guaranteed access to the official foreign exchange market to repatriate their profits and capital.
The Chilean Government has formed a Council on Innovation and Competition, hoping to bring in additional FDI to new parts of the economy.

Standard & Poor's gives Chile a credit rating of AA-. The Government of Chile continues to pay down its foreign debt, with public debt only 3.9% of GDP at the end of 2006. The Chilean central government is a net creditor with a net asset position of 7% of GDP at end 2012. The current account deficit was 4% in the first quarter of 2013, financed mostly by foreign direct investment. 14% of central government revenue came directly from copper in 2012.

Mineral resources

Chile is rich in mineral resources, especially copper and lithium. It is thought that due to the importance of lithium for batteries for electric vehicles and stabilization of electric grids with large proportions of intermittent renewables in the electricity mix, Chile could be strengthened geopolitically. However, this perspective has also been criticized for underestimating the power of economic incentives for expanded production in other parts of the world.

The country was, in 2019, the world's largest producer of copper, iodine and rhenium, the second largest producer of lithium and molybdenum, the sixth largest producer of silver, the seventh largest producer of salt, the eighth largest producer of potash, the thirteenth producer of sulfur and the thirteenth producer of iron ore in the world. The country also has considerable gold production: between 2006 and 2017, the country produced annual amounts ranging from 35.9 tonnes in 2017 to 51.3 tonnes in 2013.

Agriculture

Agriculture in Chile encompasses a wide range of different activities due to its particular geography, climate and geology and human factors. Historically agriculture is one of the bases of Chile's economy. Now agriculture and allied sectors like forestry, logging and fishing account for only 4.9% of the GDP  and employ 13.6% of the country's labor force. Chile is one of the 5 largest world producers of cherry and blueberry, and one of the 10 largest world producers of grape, apple, kiwi, peach, plum and hazelnut, focusing on exporting high-value fruits. Some other major agriculture products of Chile include pears, onions, wheat, maize, oats, garlic, asparagus, beans, beef, poultry, wool, fish, timber and hemp. Due to its geographical isolation and strict customs policies Chile is free from diseases such as mad cow disease, fruit fly and Phylloxera. This, its location in the Southern Hemisphere, which has quite different harvesting times from the Northern Hemisphere, and its wide range of agriculture conditions are considered Chile's main comparative advantages. However, Chile's mountainous landscape limits the extent and intensity of agriculture so that arable land corresponds only to 2.62% of the total territory. Chile currently utilizes 14,015 Hectares of agricultural land.

Chile is the world's second largest producer of salmon, after Norway. In 2019, it was responsible for 26% of the global supply. In wine, Chile is usually among the 10 largest producers in the world. In 2018 it was in 6th place.

Tourism

Tourism in Chile has experienced sustained growth over the last few decades. In 2005, tourism grew by 13.6%, generating more than 4.5 billion dollars of which 1.5 billion was attributed to foreign tourists. According to the National Service of Tourism (Sernatur), 2 million people a year visit the country. Most of these visitors come from other countries in the American continent, mainly Argentina; followed by a growing number from the United States, Europe, and Brazil with a growing number of Asians from South Korea and China.

The main attractions for tourists are places of natural beauty situated in the extreme zones of the country: San Pedro de Atacama, in the north, is very popular with foreign tourists who arrive to admire the Incaic architecture, the altiplano lakes, and the Valley of the Moon. In Putre, also in the north, there is the Chungará Lake, as well as the Parinacota and the Pomerape volcanoes, with altitudes of 6,348 m and 6,282 m, respectively. Throughout the central Andes there are many ski resorts of international repute, including Portillo, Valle Nevado and Termas de Chillán.

The main tourist sites in the south are national parks (the most popular is Conguillío National Park in the Araucanía) and the coastal area around Tirúa and Cañete with the Isla Mocha and the Nahuelbuta National Park, Chiloé Archipelago and Patagonia, which includes Laguna San Rafael National Park, with its many glaciers, and the Torres del Paine National Park. The central port city of Valparaíso, which is World Heritage with its unique architecture, is also popular. Finally, Easter Island in the Pacific Ocean is one of the main Chilean tourist destinations.

For locals, tourism is concentrated mostly in the summer (December to March), and mainly in the coastal beach towns. Arica, Iquique, Antofagasta, La Serena and Coquimbo are the main summer centers in the north, and Pucón on the shores of Lake Villarrica is the main center in the south. Because of its proximity to Santiago, the coast of the Valparaíso Region, with its many beach resorts, receives the largest number of tourists. Viña del Mar, Valparaíso's more affluent northern neighbor, is popular because of its beaches, casino, and its annual song festival, the most important musical event in Latin America. Pichilemu in the O'Higgins Region is widely known as South America's "best surfing spot" according to Fodor's.

In November 2005 the government launched a campaign under the brand "Chile: All Ways Surprising" intended to promote the country internationally for both business and tourism. Museums in Chile such as the Chilean National Museum of Fine Arts built in 1880, feature works by Chilean artists.

Chile is home to the world-renowned Patagonian Trail that resides on the border between Argentina and Chile. Chile recently launched a massive scenic route for tourism in hopes of encouraging development based on conservation.

Transport

Due to Chile's topography a functioning transport network is vital to its economy. In 2020, Chile had  of highways, with  paved. In the same year, the country had  of duplicated highways, the second largest network in South America, after Brazil. Since the mid-1990s, there has been a significant improvement in the country's roads, through bidding processes that allowed the construction of an efficient road network, with emphasis on the duplication of continuous  of the Panamerican Highway (Chile Route 5) between Puerto Montt and Caldera (in addition to the planned duplication in the Atacama Desert area), the excerpts in between Santiago, Valparaiso and the Central Coast, and the northern access to Concepción and the large project of the Santiago urban highways network, opened between 2004 and 2006. Buses are now the main means of long-distance transportation in Chile, following the decline of its railway network. The bus system covers the entire country, from Arica to Santiago (a 30-hour journey) and from Santiago to Punta Arenas (about 40 hours, with a change at Osorno).

Chile has a total of 372 runways (62 paved and 310 unpaved). Important airports in Chile include Chacalluta International Airport (Arica), Diego Aracena International Airport (Iquique), Andrés Sabella Gálvez International Airport
(Antofagasta), Carriel Sur International Airport (Concepción), El Tepual International Airport (Puerto Montt), Presidente Carlos Ibáñez del Campo International Airport (Punta Arenas), La Araucanía International Airport (Temuco), Mataveri International Airport (Easter Island), the most remote airport in the world, as defined by distance to another airport, and the Comodoro Arturo Merino Benítez International Airport (Santiago) with a traffic of 12,105,524 passengers in 2011. Santiago is headquarters of Latin America's largest airline holding company and Chilean flag carrier LATAM Airlines.

Telecommunications

Chile has a telecommunication system which covers much of the country, including Chilean insular and Antarctic bases. Privatization of the telephone system began in 1988; Chile has one of the most advanced telecommunications infrastructure in South America with a modern system based on extensive microwave radio relay facilities and a domestic satellite system with 3 earth stations. In 2012, there were 3.276 million main lines in use and 24.13 million mobile cellular telephone subscribers. According to a 2012 database of the International Telecommunication Union (ITU), 61.42% of the Chilean population uses the internet, making Chile the country with the highest internet penetration in South America. The Chilean internet country code is ".cl".

Energy

Chile's total energy supply (TES) was 23.0GJ per capita in 2020. Energy in Chile is dominated by fossil fuels, with coal, oil and gas accounting for 73.4% of the total primary energy. Biofuels and waste account for another 20.5% of primary energy supply, with the rest sourced from hydro and other renewables.

Electricity consumption was 68.90 TWh in 2014. Main sources of electricity in Chile are hydroelectricity, gas, oil and coal. Renewable energy in the forms of wind and solar energy are also coming into use, encouraged by collaboration since 2009 with the United States Department of Energy. The electricity industry is privatized with ENDESA as the largest company in the field.

In 2021, Chile had, in terms of installed renewable electricity, 6,807 MW in hydropower (28th largest in the world), 3,137 MW in wind power (28th largest in the world), 4,468 MW in solar (22nd largest in the world), and 375 MW in biomass. As the Atacama Desert has the highest solar irradiation in the world, and Chile has always had problems obtaining oil, gas and coal (the country basically does not produce them, so it has to import them), renewable energy is seen as the solution for the country's shortcomings in the energy field.

Demographics 

Chile's 2017 census reported a population of 17,574,003. Its rate of population growth has been decreasing since 1990, due to a declining birth rate. By 2050 the population is expected to reach approximately 20.2 million people.

Ancestry and ethnicity 

Mexican professor Francisco Lizcano, of the National Autonomous University of Mexico, estimated that 52.7% of Chileans were white, 39.3% were mestizo, and 8% were Amerindian.

In 1984, a study called Sociogenetic Reference Framework for Public Health Studies in Chile, from the Revista de Pediatría de Chile determined an ancestry of 67.9% European, and 32.1% Native American. In 1994, a biological study determined that the Chilean composition was 64% European and 35% Amerindian. The recent study in the Candela Project establishes that the genetic composition of Chile is 52% of European origin, with 44% of the genome coming from Native Americans (Amerindians), and 4% coming from Africa, making Chile a primarily mestizo country with traces of African descent present in half of the population. Another genetic study conducted by the University of Brasilia in several South American countries shows a similar genetic composition for Chile, with a European contribution of 51.6%, an Amerindian contribution of 42.1%, and an African contribution of 6.3%. In 2015 another study established genetic composition in 57% European, 38% Native American, and 2.5% African.

A public health booklet from the University of Chile states that 64% of the population is of Caucasian origin; "predominantly White" Mestizos are estimated to amount to a total of 35%, while Native Americans (Amerindians) comprise the remaining 5%.

Despite the genetic considerations, many Chileans, if asked, would self-identify as White. The 2011 Latinobarómetro survey asked respondents in Chile what race they considered themselves to belong to. Most answered "White" (59%), while 25% said "Mestizo" and 8% self-classified as "indigenous". A 2002 national poll revealed that a majority of Chileans believed they possessed some (43.4%) or much (8.3%) "indigenous blood", while 40.3% responded that they had none.

The 1907 census reported 101,118 Natives or 3.1% of the total population. Only those that practiced their native culture or spoke their native language were considered to be Natives, irrespective of their "racial purity". In 2002 a census took place, directly asking the public whether they considered themselves as part of any of the eight Chilean ethnic groups, regardless of whether or not they maintained their culture, traditions and language, and 4.6% of the population (692,192 people) fitted that description of indigenous peoples in Chile. Of that number, 87.3% declared themselves Mapuche. Most of the indigenous population shows varying degrees of mixed ancestry.
Chile is one of 22 countries to have signed and ratified the only binding international law concerning indigenous peoples, the Indigenous and Tribal Peoples Convention, 1989. It was adopted in 1989 as the International Labour Organization (ILO) Convention 169. Chile ratified it in 2008. A Chilean court decision in November 2009, considered to be a landmark ruling on indigenous rights, made use of the convention. The Supreme Court decision on Aymara water rights upheld rulings by both the Pozo Almonte tribunal and the Iquique Court of Appeals and marks the first judicial application of ILO Convention 169 in Chile.

The earliest European immigrants were Spanish colonisers who arrived in the 16th century. The Amerindian population of central Chile was absorbed into the Spanish settler population in the beginning of the colonial period to form the large mestizo population that exists in Chile today; mestizos create modern middle and lower classes. In the 18th and 19th centuries, many Basques came to Chile where they integrated into the existing elites of Castilian origin. Postcolonial Chile was never a particularly attractive destination for migrants, owing to its remoteness and distance from Europe. Europeans preferred to stay in countries closer to their homelands instead of taking the long journey through the Straits of Magellan or crossing the Andes. European migration did not result in a significant change in the ethnic composition of Chile, except in the region of Magellan. Spaniards were the only major European migrant group to Chile, and there was never large-scale immigration such as that to Argentina or Brazil. Between 1851 and 1924, Chile only received 0.5% of European immigration to Latin America, compared to 46% to Argentina, 33% to Brazil, 14% to Cuba, and 4% to Uruguay. However, it is undeniable that immigrants have played a significant role in Chilean society.

Most of the immigrants to Chile during the 19th and 20th centuries came from France, Great Britain, Germany, and Croatia, among others. Descendants of different European ethnic groups often intermarried in Chile. This intermarriage and mixture of cultures and races have helped to shape the present society and culture of the Chilean middle and upper classes. Also, roughly 500,000 of Chile's population is of full or partial Palestinian origin, and 800,000 Arab descents. Chile currently has 1.5 million of Latin American immigrants, mainly from Venezuela, Peru, Haiti, Colombia, Bolivia and Argentina; 8% of the total population in 2019, without counting descendants. According to the 2002 national census, Chile's foreign-born population has increased by 75% since 1992. As of November 2021, numbers of people entering Chile from elsewhere in Latin America have grown swiftly in the last decade, tripling in the last three years to 1.5 million, with arrivals stemming from humanitarian crises in Haiti (ca. 180,000) and Venezuela (ca 460,000).

Urbanization 
About 85% of the country's population lives in urban areas, with 40% living in Greater Santiago. The largest agglomerations according to the 2002 census are Greater Santiago with 5.6 million people, Greater Concepción with 861,000
and Greater Valparaíso with 824,000.

Religion

, 66.6% of Chilean population over 15 years of age claimed to adhere to the Roman Catholic church, a decrease from the 70% reported in the 2002 census. In the same census of 2012, 17% of Chileans reported adherence to an Evangelical church ("Evangelical" in the census referred to all Christian denominations other than the Roman Catholic and Orthodox—Greek, Persian, Serbian, Ukrainian, and Armenian—churches, The Church of Jesus Christ of Latter-day Saints or Mormons, Seventh-day Adventists, and Jehovah's Witnesses: essentially, those denominations generally still termed "Protestant" in most English-speaking lands, although Adventism is often considered an Evangelical denomination as well). Approximately 90% of Evangelical Christians are Pentecostal. but Wesleyan, Lutheran, Anglican, Episcopalian, Presbyterian, other Reformed, Baptist, and Methodist churches also are present amongst Chilean Evangelical churches. Irreligious people, atheists, and agnostics account for around 12% of the population.

By 2015, the major religion in Chile remained Christianity (68%), with an estimated 55% of Chileans belonging to the Roman Catholic church, 13% to various Evangelical churches, and just 7% adhering to any other religion. Agnostics and atheist were estimated at 25% of the population.

Chile has a Baháʼí religious community, and is home to the Baháʼí mother temple, or continental House of Worship, for Latin America. Completed in 2016, it serves as a space for people of all religions and backgrounds to gather, meditate, reflect, and worship. It is formed from cast glass and translucent marble and has been described as innovative in its architectural style.

The Constitution guarantees the right to freedom of religion, and other laws and policies contribute to generally free religious practice. The law at all levels fully protects this right against abuse by either governmental or private actors. Church and state are officially separate in Chile. A 1999 law on religion prohibits religious discrimination. 
However, the Roman Catholic church for mostly historical and social reasons enjoys a privileged status and occasionally receives preferential treatment. Government officials attend Roman Catholic events as well as major Evangelical and Jewish ceremonies.

The Chilean government treats the religious holidays of Christmas, Good Friday, the Feast of the Virgin of Carmen, the Feast of Saints Peter and Paul, the Feast of the Assumption, All Saints' Day, and the Feast of the Immaculate Conception as national holidays. Recently, the government declared 31 October, Reformation Day, to be an additional national holiday, in honor of the Evangelical churches of the country.

The patron saints of Chile are Our Lady of Mount Carmel and Saint James the Greater (Santiago). In 2005, Pope Benedict XVI canonized Alberto Hurtado, who became the country's second native Roman Catholic saint after Teresa de los Andes.

Languages 

The Spanish spoken in Chile is distinctively accented and quite unlike that of neighboring South American countries because final syllables are often dropped, and some consonants have a soft pronunciation. Accent varies only very slightly from north to south; more noticeable are the differences in accent based on social class or whether one lives in the city or the country. That the Chilean population was largely formed in a small section at the center of the country and then migrated in modest numbers to the north and south helps explain this relative lack of differentiation, which was maintained by the national reach of radio, and now television, which also helps to diffuse and homogenize colloquial expressions.

There are several indigenous languages spoken in Chile: Mapudungun, Aymara, Rapa Nui, Chilean Sign Language and (barely surviving) Qawasqar and Yaghan, along with non-indigenous German, Italian, English, Greek and Quechua. After the Spanish conquest, Spanish took over as the lingua franca and the indigenous languages have become minority languages, with some now extinct or close to extinction.

German is still spoken to some extent in southern Chile, either in small countryside pockets or as a second language among the communities of larger cities.

Through initiatives such as the English Opens Doors Program, the government made English mandatory for students in fifth grade and above in public schools. Most private schools in Chile start teaching English from kindergarten. Common English words have been absorbed and appropriated into everyday Spanish speech.

Health 

The Ministry of Health (Minsal) is the cabinet-level administrative office in charge of planning, directing, coordinating, executing, controlling and informing the public health policies formulated by the President of Chile. The National Health Fund (Fonasa), created in 1979, is the financial entity entrusted to collect, manage and distribute state funds for health in Chile. It is funded by the public. All employees pay 7% of their monthly income to the fund.

Fonasa is part of the NHSS and has executive power through the Ministry of Health (Chile). Its headquarters are in Santiago and decentralized public service is conducted by various Regional Offices. More than 12 million beneficiaries benefit from Fonasa. Beneficiaries can also opt for more costly private insurance through Isapre.

Education 

In Chile, education begins with preschool until the age of 5. Primary school is provided for children between ages 6 and 13. Students then attend secondary school until graduation at age 17.

Secondary education is divided into two parts: During the first two years, students receive a general education. Then, they choose a branch: scientific humanistic education, artistic education, or technical and professional education. Secondary school ends two years later on the acquirement of a certificate (licencia de enseñanza media).

Chilean education is segregated by wealth in a three-tiered system – the quality of the schools reflects socioeconomic backgrounds:
 city schools (colegios municipales) that are mostly free and have the worst education results, mostly attended by poor students;
 subsidized schools that receive some money from the government which can be supplemented by fees paid by the student's family, which are attended by mid-income students and typically get mid-level results; and 
 entirely private schools that consistently get the best results. Many private schools charge attendance fees of 0,5 to 1 median household income.

Upon successful graduation of secondary school, students may continue into higher education. The higher education schools in Chile consist of Chilean Traditional Universities and are divided into public universities or private universities. There are medical schools and both the Universidad de Chile and Universidad Diego Portales offer law schools in a partnership with Yale University.

Culture

From the period between early agricultural settlements and up to the late pre-Columbian period, northern Chile was a region of Andean culture that was influenced by altiplano traditions spreading to the coastal valleys of the north, while southern regions were areas of Mapuche cultural activities. Throughout the colonial period following the conquest, and during the early Republican period, the country's culture was dominated by the Spanish. Other European influences, primarily English, French, and German began in the 19th century and have continued to this day. German migrants influenced the Bavarian style rural architecture and cuisine in the south of Chile in cities such as Valdivia, Frutillar, Puerto Varas, Osorno, Temuco, Puerto Octay, Llanquihue, Faja Maisan, Pitrufquén, Victoria, Pucón and Puerto Montt.

Music and dance

Music in Chile ranges from folkloric, popular and classical music. Its large geography generates different musical styles in the north, center and south of the country, including also Easter Island and Mapuche music. The national dance is the cueca. Another form of traditional Chilean song, though not a dance, is the tonada. Arising from music imported by the Spanish colonists, it is distinguished from the cueca by an intermediate melodic section and a more prominent melody.

Between 1950 and 1970 appears a rebirth in folk music leading by groups such as Los de Ramón, Los Cuatro Huasos and Los Huasos Quincheros, among others with composers such as Raúl de Ramón, Violeta Parra and others. In the mid-1960s native musical forms were revitalized by the Parra family with the Nueva canción Chilena, which was associated with political activists and reformers such as Víctor Jara, Inti-Illimani, and Quilapayún. Other important folk singer and researcher on folklore and Chilean ethnography, is Margot Loyola. Also, many Chilean rock bands like Los Jaivas, Los Prisioneros, La Ley, and Los Tres have reached international success. In February, annual music festivals are held in Viña del Mar.

Literature

Chile is a country of poets. Gabriela Mistral was the first Latin American to receive a Nobel Prize in Literature (1945). Chile's most famous poet is Pablo Neruda, who received the Nobel Prize for Literature (1971) and is world-renowned for his extensive library of works on romance, nature, and politics. His three highly personalized homes in Isla Negra, Santiago and Valparaíso are popular tourist destinations.

Among the list of other Chilean poets are Carlos Pezoa Véliz, Vicente Huidobro, Gonzalo Rojas, Pablo de Rokha, Nicanor Parra, Ivonne Coñuecar and Raúl Zurita. Isabel Allende is the best-selling Chilean novelist, with 51 million of her novels sold worldwide. Novelist José Donoso's novel The Obscene Bird of Night is considered by critic Harold Bloom to be one of the canonical works of 20th-century Western literature. Another internationally recognized Chilean novelist and poet is Roberto Bolaño whose translations into English have had an excellent reception from the critics.

Cuisine

Chilean cuisine is a reflection of the country's topographical variety, featuring an assortment of seafood, beef, fruits, and vegetables. Traditional recipes include asado, cazuela, empanadas, humitas, pastel de choclo, pastel de papas, curanto, and sopaipillas. Crudos is an example of the mixture of culinary contributions from the various ethnic influences in Chile. The raw minced llama, heavy use of shellfish, and rice bread were taken from native Quechua Andean cuisine, (although beef, brought to Chile by Europeans, is also used in place of the llama meat), lemon and onions were brought by the Spanish colonists, and the use of mayonnaise and yogurt was introduced by German immigrants, as was beer.

Folklore

The folklore of Chile, cultural and demographic characteristics of the country, is the result of the mixture of Spanish and Amerindian elements that occurred during the colonial period. Due to cultural and historical reasons, they are classified and distinguished four major areas in the country: northern areas, central, southern and south. Most of the traditions of the culture of Chile have a festive purpose, but some, such as dances and ceremonies, have religious components.

Chilean mythology is the mythology and beliefs of the Folklore of Chile. This includes Chilote mythology, Rapa Nui mythology and Mapuche mythology.

Sports

Chile's most popular sport is association football. Chile has appeared in nine FIFA World Cups which includes hosting the 1962 FIFA World Cup where the national football team finished third. Other results achieved by the national football team include two Copa América titles (2015 and 2016), two runners-up positions, one silver and two bronze medals at the Pan American Games, a bronze medal at the 2000 Summer Olympics and two third places finishes in the FIFA under-17 and under-20 youth tournaments. The top league in the Chilean football league system is the Chilean Primera División, which is named by the IFFHS as the ninth strongest national football league in the world.

The main football clubs are Colo-Colo, Universidad de Chile and Universidad Católica. Colo-Colo is the country's most successful football club, having both the most national and international championships, including the coveted Copa Libertadores South American club tournament. Universidad de Chile was the last international champion (Copa Sudamericana 2011).

Tennis is Chile's most successful sport. Its national team won the World Team Cup clay tournament twice (2003 & 2004), and played the Davis Cup final against Italy in 1976. At the 2004 Summer Olympics the country captured gold and bronze in men's singles and gold in men's doubles (Nicolás Massú obtained two gold medals). Marcelo Ríos became the first Latin American man to reach the number one spot in the ATP singles rankings in 1998. Anita Lizana won the US Open in 1937, becoming the first woman from Latin America to win a Grand Slam tournament. Luis Ayala was twice a runner-up at the French Open and both Ríos and Fernando González reached the Australian Open men's singles finals. González also won a silver medal in singles at the 2008 Summer Olympics in Beijing.

At the Summer Olympic Games Chile boasts a total of two gold medals (tennis), seven silver medals (athletics, equestrian, boxing, shooting and tennis) and four bronze medals (tennis, boxing and football). In 2012, Chile won its first Paralympic Games medal (gold in Athletics).

Rodeo is the country's national sport and is practiced in the more rural areas of the nation. A sport similar to hockey called chueca was played by the Mapuche people during the Spanish conquest. Skiing and snowboarding are practiced at ski centers located in the Central Andes, and in southern ski centers near to cities as Osorno, Puerto Varas, Temuco and Punta Arenas. Surfing is popular at some coastal towns. Polo is professionally practiced within Chile, with the country achieving top prize in the 2008 and 2015 World Polo Championship.

Basketball is a popular sport in which Chile earned a bronze medal in the first men's FIBA World Championship held in 1950 and won a second bronze medal when Chile hosted the 1959 FIBA World Championship. Chile hosted the first FIBA World Championship for Women in 1953 finishing the tournament with the silver medal. San Pedro de Atacama is host to the annual "Atacama Crossing", a six-stage,  footrace which annually attracts about 150 competitors from 35 countries. The Dakar Rally off-road automobile race has been held in both Chile and Argentina since 2009.

Cultural heritage
The cultural heritage of Chile consists, first, of its intangible heritage, composed of various cultural events and activities, such as visual arts, crafts, dances, holidays, cuisine, games, music and traditions.  Secondly, its tangible heritage consists of those buildings, objects and sites of archaeological, architectural, traditional, artistic, ethnographic, folkloric, historical, religious or technological significance scattered through Chilean territory.  Among them, some are declared World Heritage Sites by UNESCO, in accordance with the provisions of the Convention concerning the Protection of World Cultural and Natural Heritage of 1972, ratified by Chile in 1980. These cultural sites are the Rapa Nui National Park (1995), the Churches of Chiloé (2000), the historical district of the port city of Valparaíso (2003), Humberstone and Santa Laura Saltpeter Works (2005) and the mining city Sewell (2006).

In 1999 Cultural Heritage Day was established as a way to honour and commemorate Chile's cultural heritage. It is an official national event celebrated in May every year.

See also

 Index of Chile-related articles
 Outline of Chile
 COVID-19 pandemic in Chile

References

Notes

Citations

Further reading

 Christian Balteum: The Strip. A Marxist critique of a semicomparador economy, University of Vermont Press, 2018
 Simon Collier and William F. Sater, A History of Chile, 1808–1894, Cambridge University Press, 1996
 Paul W. Drake, and others., Chile: A Country Study, Library of Congress, 1994
 Luis Galdames, A History of Chile, University of North Carolina Press, 1941
 
 Brian Lovemen, Chile: The Legacy of Hispanic Capitalism, 3rd ed., Oxford University Press, 2001
 John L. Rector, The History of Chile, Greenwood Press, 2003

External links

Official Chile Government website
ThisIsChile Tourism & Commerce Website 
Chile. The World Factbook. Central Intelligence Agency.
 Chile from UCB Libraries GovPubs

 Chile profile from the BBC News
 Road maps of Chile, interactive
World Bank Summary Trade Statistics Chile

 Key Development Forecasts for Chile from International Futures
 Chile Cultural Society

 
G15 nations
Former Spanish colonies
Republics
States and territories established in 1818
Spanish-speaking countries and territories
Countries in South America
Member states of the United Nations
1818 establishments in South America
Southern Cone countries
1818 establishments in Chile
Transcontinental countries
OECD members